Leo Loren, better known by the stage name Baga Chipz, is an English drag queen known for competing on the first series of RuPaul's Drag Race UK (2019) and later the first season of RuPaul's Drag Race: UK vs the World (2022). Baga Chipz also appeared in the fifth series of the Channel 4 school drama series Ackley Bridge (2022).

Career
Baga Chipz is a part of "The Buffalo Girls", a drag troupe also featuring Lady Lloyd and Silver Summers.

In 2014, Baga Chipz appeared in Drag Queens of London, a series documenting the lives of drag queens over a three-month period, both on and off the stage.

On 21 August 2019, Baga Chipz was announced as one of the ten queens to be competing in the first series of RuPaul's Drag Race UK. Baga Chipz won three challenges and finished in third place. During November and December 2019, Baga Chipz and the cast of series one of RuPauls Drag Race UK embarked on a tour hosted by Drag Race alumna Alyssa Edwards. In January 2020, Baga Chipz attended the first ever RuPaul's DragCon UK.

In December 2019, Baga Chipz, alongside fellow RuPaul's Drag Race UK contestant The Vivienne, began starring in Morning T&T on WOW Presents Plus. The show sees The Vivienne and Baga Chipz reprise their Snatch Game impersonations of Donald Trump and Margaret Thatcher, respectively, to host fictional television news show, and consisted of six episodes as of January 2020. At DragCon UK in January 2020 an additional episode was filmed with The Vivienne and Baga Chipz appearing as themselves. Guests on the web series included fellow Drag Race UK alumni Sum Ting Wong as Queen Elizabeth II and Cheryl Hole as Gemma Collins.

In March 2020, Baga Chipz, once again alongside The Vivienne, started presenting the UK version of I Like to Watch, a web series produced by Netflix in which they review Netflix programming.

Baga Chipz is known for her Amy Winehouse impression.

In July 2020, Baga Chipz appeared on Celebrity Masterchef. On 8 July 2020, Baga Chipz was eliminated from the competition.

In September 2020, Baga Chipz released her debut single titled "When The Sun Goes Down" in collaboration with Saara Aalto. She also appeared on the ITV series Celebrity Karaoke Club which started on 23 September 2020. In 2021, she was cast in the Channel 4 school drama series Ackley Bridge; she appeared in the fifth series in 2022.

Discography

Studio albums

Singles

As featured artist

Filmography

Television

Music videos

Web series

Theatre

References

External links 

 Baga Chipz at the Internet Movie Database

Year of birth missing (living people)
Living people
20th-century English LGBT people
21st-century English LGBT people
English drag queens
Gay entertainers
RuPaul's Drag Race UK contestants